Alexander Evans (born 28 January 1997) is an Australian cyclist, who currently rides for UCI WorldTeam .

Major results
2018
 8th Overall Herald Sun Tour
2019
 1st Stage 8 Tour de l'Avenir
 10th Overall Tour Alsace
2022
 9th Overall Oberösterreich Rundfahrt

References

External links

1997 births
Living people
Australian male cyclists
Sportspeople from Bendigo